E 501 is a European B class road in France, connecting the cities Le Mans — Angers

Routes and E-road junctions
 
 Le Mans:  E50, E402, E502
 Angers

External links 
 UN Economic Commission for Europe: Overall Map of E-road Network (2007)
 International E-road network

International E-road network
Roads in France